Niranjan Varma (October 1914 – 17 March 2012) was an Indian politician. He was a Member of Parliament, representing Madhya  Pradesh in the Rajya Sabha the upper house of India's Parliament as a member of the Bharatiya Jana Sangh. Varma died on 17 March 2012, at the age of 97.

References

1914 births
2012 deaths
Bharatiya Jana Sangh politicians
Rajya Sabha members from Madhya Pradesh